The ACEGES model (Agent-based Computational Economics of the Global Energy System) is a decision support tool for energy policy by means of controlled computational experiments. The ACEGES tool is designed to be the foundation for large custom-purpose simulations of the global energy system.  The ACEGES methodological framework, developed by Voudouris (2011) by extending Voudouris (2010), is based on the agent-based computational economics (ACE) paradigm. ACE is the computational study of economies modeled as evolving systems of autonomous interacting agents.

The ACEGES tool is written in Java and runs on Windows, Mac OS and Linux platforms. The ACEGES tool is based on:
 The MASON librarya discrete-event multiagent simulation library
 The R Project for statistical computing
 The GAMLSS framework 

It is important to clarify that although the ACEGES model builds on the available scholarly and policy literature, it does not strictly follow any existing approach.

History 
The ACEGES project was conceived by Vlasios Voudouris (with contributions by Michael Jefferson). Voudouris is now head of Data Science at Argus Media.  The first version of the ACEGES decision-support tool was written in 2010. The ACEGES models energy demand and supply of 218 countries. The ACEGES tool was the main output of the ACEGES Project. The overall aim of the ACEGES project was to develop, test and disseminate an agent-based computational laboratory for the systematic experimental study of the global energy system through the mechanism of Energy Scenarios. In particular, the intention was to show how the ACEGES framework and prototype can be used to help leaders in government, business and civil society better understand the challenging outlook for energy through controlled computational experiments.

Demonstrations 
The ACEGES tool has been used, for example, to test the peak oil theory and to develop plausible scenarios of conventional oil production by means of demonstration at:
 4th International Conference on Computational and Financial Econometrics, University of London & London School of Economics, 2010
 16th International Conference on Computing in Economics and Finance, Society for Computational Economics, 2010
 Università Bocconi, 2010
 UCL Energy Institute, 2011
Moscow State University, 2011
 UK Energy Day: Sustainable Supply – An energy day within the EU Sustainable Energy Europe Week supported by the Intelligent Energy Europe, 2011
 Energy and Climate Change select committee (Westminster system), UK Parliament- The UK’s Energy Supply: security or independence? Link, 2011

Details about the ACEGES decision-support tool (including supporting documentation) are available from ABM Analytics.

References 

Computational economics
Decision support systems
Energy economics
Energy models
Simulation software